8 Mai 1945 - Guelma University, also called Guelma University , is located in Guelma, Algeria, on the north eastern coast of Algeria.

General
The University 8 Mai 1945 Guelma has 7 faculties:

 Faculty of Science and Technology,
 Faculty of Mathematics, Computer Science and sciences of matter,
 Faculty of Economics and Business,
 Faculty of Natural and Life Sciences and Earth and Universe Sciences (SNVSTU),
 Faculty of Law and Political Science,
 Faculty of Letters and Languages,
 Faculty of human and social sciences.

It also brings together 23 research laboratories.

It has 4 vice rectorates:

 Vice rectorate of higher education for the first and second cycles, continuing education and diplomas, and graduation
 Vice Rectorate of Postgraduate Training, University Habilitation, Scientific Research and Post-Graduation Training
 Vice rectorate of external relations, cooperation, animation, communication and scientific events
 Vice Rectorate of Development, Foresight and Guidance

Numbers  

The student body of the University 8 Mai 1945 - Guelma during the university year 2020-2021 is: 17,530 students distributed as follows:
 Graduation: (17004)
 post-graduation: (526)

The teaching staff during the 2020-2021 university year is broken down by grade as follows:

The University 8 Mai 1945 -Guelma also has 553 employees (ATS) and 259 contractual employees.

See also 
 List of universities in Algeria

References

External links
 https://www.univ-guelma.dz/

1986 establishments in Algeria
Educational institutions established in 1986
Guelma
Buildings and structures in Guelma Province